The Contortionist's Handbook is the debut novel by novelist Craig Clevenger.

Plot summary
John Dolan Vincent is a talented young forger with a proclivity for mathematics and drug addiction. In the face of his impending institutionalization, he continually reinvents himself to escape the legal and mental health authorities and to save himself from a life of incarceration. But running turns out to be costly. Vincent's clients in the L.A. underworld lose patience, the hospital evaluator may not be fooled by his story, and the only person in as much danger as himself is the woman who knows his real name.

Characters
 John Dolan Vincent
Daniel John Fletcher:
Brian Delvine: The alias Vincent used while living in Los Angeles. He then became Martin Kelly to cover up traffic warrants, an eviction, and a drug screening.
Martin Kelly:  "Born to" Liam and Fiona Kelly, a deceased couple that Vincent had picked out of The Boston Globe.
Paul MacIntyre: The identity Vincent created for the son of a stripper that had left and taken her son to live in Virginia before all of the paperwork could get pushed through.
 Keara/Molly Wheeler 
 "The Evaluator" 
 Jeremy 
 Shelly 
 Mom 
 Dad 
 Officer Durrell 
 Brett    A childhood neighbor to Vincent, first seen meticulously cutting the front lawn while being berated by his mother. Eventually he is found to be visiting the same psychiatric doctor's office that the young John Dolan Vincent went to for treatment of his headaches. Brett is later pacing his front yard sans a lawnmower, being used as a foil to highlight the direction that John could have gone.
 Brett's Mom 
 Dr. Gaines 
 Dr. Fred Smith 
 "The Prosecutor" 
 "The Defense Attorney" 
 Erica 
 Dr. Carlisle 
 Andrea    The sister of Keara's that moved to San Diego from the East Coast for graduate school. Keara visits her while John makes a new home and identities for he and Keara. Andrea also serves as the source of an argument between John and Keara, Keara clearly jealous of her sister (possibly alluding to a prior tryst between Andrea and one of Keara's lovers).
 Sudden    The girl that turned John Dolan Vincent onto cocaine. She was a stripper that choked Vincent until he was unconscious while giving him a lap dance and she then stole his money. Three nights later they slept together.
 Jimmy  The doorman of the nightclub where Sudden danced. He was Sudden's cocaine hookup, who then became Vincent's hookup, who then introduced him to Ray, Jimmy's hookup. The employers of the club became the source of Vincent's mob connections, as Vincent made social security numbers, passports, etc. for them. Jimmy insisted that Vincent meet with more people to work for, but when Vincent became Paul MacIntyre, Vincent decided to disappear instead.
 Sharon  Worked with Sudden at the nightclub Vincent frequented. She needed her life to get cleaned up in order to keep her son that the State was threatening to take, so Vincent gave her and her son Paul new identities. Sharon took her son to live with her parents in Virginia, and so Vincent used the identity that he had made for her son to his advantage.
 Natalie  Met Vincent while he was posing as Paul MacIntyre during a show at Coconut Teazer. The relationship was doomed from the start as her lifestyle was that of excess, and his of course one of staying invisible. On their first official date together, they went to a place where Vincent had failed to make a reservation. After waiting twenty-eight minutes, she gets indignant with him. He responds and she slaps him, twice. He drags her to her car and they proceed to have sex in the parking lot. The relationship continued on like this, she out of his league, her slumming it, both of them enjoying the violent activity behind closed doors. The relationship ended when she came to the conclusion that it would not work due to the two of them being an Aries.

Film Adaptation
The novel's film rights were optioned by Greenestreet Films in 2007. Currently British filmmaker Miguel Sapochnik has been hired to direct the film based on a screenplay by Robin Shushan. Clevenger has expressed his disapproval for the screenplay and the changes made to the plot of this novel with a posting on his website in September 2010.

Reviews
Tied Up In Knots - Irvine Welsh - http://www.guardian.co.uk
Counter-Clevenger - Peter Conover - http://www.dailynexus.com

U.S. editions
MacAdam/Cage Publishing, September 2002. Hardback First Edition. 
MacAdam/Cage Publishing, September 2003. Paperback Edition. 
Fourth Estate, April 4, 2005. Hardback Second Edition.

See also

 Neo-noir

References

External links
 Official site of Craig Clevenger
 Official online community of Craig Clevenger, Will Christopher Baer, and Stephen Graham Jones
Pete's Candy Store Reading (Dermaphoria Tour)

2002 American novels
Existentialist novels
Fiction with unreliable narrators
Postmodern novels
2002 debut novels
MacAdam/Cage books